California's 75th State Assembly district is one of 80 California State Assembly districts. It is currently represented by Republican Marie Waldron of Escondido.

District profile 
The district encompasses inland parts of San Diego County's North County region and the southernmost reaches of the Inland Empire. The area is mountainous, with northern San Diego exurbs comprising most of the population.

Riverside County – 5.4%
 Temecula

San Diego County – 11.2%
 Bonsall
 Escondido
 Fallbrook
 Hidden Meadows
 Lake San Marcos
 Rainbow
 San Marcos
 Valley Center

Election results from statewide races

List of Assembly Members
Due to redistricting, the 75th district has been moved around different parts of the state. The current iteration resulted from the 2011 redistricting by the California Citizens Redistricting Commission.

Election results 1992 - present

2022

2020

2018

2016

2014

2012

2010

2008

2006

2004

2002

2000

1998

1996

1994

1992

Notes

See also 
 California State Assembly
 California State Assembly districts
 Districts in California

References

External links 
 District map from the California Citizens Redistricting Commission

75
Government of San Diego County, California
Assembly 75
North County (San Diego County)
Escondido, California
San Marcos, California
Temecula, California
Valley Center, California